John Len Ruela Adamo Pearce (born 25 February 1991) is an Australian entertainer best known as a member of Justice Crew, and also a member of the children's band The Wiggles.

Early life and education
Pearce is of Filipino descent. His twin brother Len was also a member of Justice Crew.

Career
Pearce was a member of Justice Crew when the group came to prominence winning the 2010 season of Australia's Got Talent. During his time with the group, they released two ARIA chart-topping songs and two further top ten singles, and earned eight ARIA Award nominations.

Pearce also worked as a personal trainer and appeared in the 2017 season of Australian Ninja Warrior.

In 2021, Pearce joined The Wiggles in the group's expansion from four to eight performers. As "Big Strong John", he wears a purple skivvy, and has an interest in health and exercise. Pearce's television debut for The Wiggles was in the Fruit Salad TV YouTube series, and in 2022 embarked on the national Australian "Fruit Salad TV Big Show" arena tour with the band.

In January 2023, Pearce received international media attention in response to his viral popularity amongst parents of Wiggles fans, due to his handsome appearance and his promotion of healthy habits.

Personal life
Pearce married Jessie Adamo in 2019, having been in a relationship since 2012.

References

Living people
21st-century Australian singers
Australian male dancers
Australian male singers
Australian people of Filipino descent
Australian TikTokers
The Wiggles members
1991 births